David Kidder (December 8, 1787 – November 1, 1860) was an American politician and a member of the United States House of Representatives from Maine.

Kidder was born on December 8, 1787, in Pownalborough, Massachusetts (now known as Dresden, Maine). He pursued classical studies with private tutors, studied law, was admitted to the bar, and commenced practice in Bloomfield. He moved to Skowhegan in 1817, and then to Norridgewock in 1821. He was a prosecuting attorney of Somerset County from 1811 to 1823.

Kidder was elected as an Adams-Clay Democratic-Republican to the Eighteenth Congress and re-elected as an Adams candidate to the Nineteenth Congress. He served from March 4, 1823, to March 3, 1827. He was not a candidate for renomination in 1826. He returned to Skowhegan in 1827 and returned to the practice of law. He was a member of the Maine House of Representatives in 1829. He died in Skowhegan, Maine, on November 1, 1860. He was interred in Bloomfield Cemetery.

Sources

1787 births
1860 deaths
Members of the Maine House of Representatives
People from Skowhegan, Maine
Maine Democratic-Republicans
People from Dresden, Maine
Democratic-Republican Party members of the United States House of Representatives
National Republican Party members of the United States House of Representatives from Maine
19th-century American politicians